Ceranemota tearlei is a moth in the family Drepanidae. It was described by Henry Edwards in 1888. It is found in North America, where it has been recorded from British Columbia and central Alberta south to central California in the west and to Utah and Colorado in the Rocky Mountains. The habitat consists of higher elevation spruce-fir and mixed hardwood-conifer forests, lower elevation ponderosa pine forests, quaking aspen forests and moist riparian areas along creeks and rivers.

The length of the forewings is 16–20 mm. The forewings are steel grey, lightest and nearly uniform in the median area and darker and more mottled elsewhere. The hindwings are lighter grey with somewhat darker markings. Adults are on wing from late August to October in one generation per year.

The larvae feed on Amelanchier alnifolia, Sorbus scopulina and Salix species.

References

Moths described in 1888
Thyatirinae